#PobreNovio is a Chilean telenovela created by Alejandro Cabrera for Mega. It aired from August 9, 2021 to June 7, 2022. It stars Etienne Bobenrieth, Montserrat Ballarín, Francisca Walker, Diego Muñoz, Francisca Walker, Hector Noguera, Sigrid Alegria, Carolina Arregui, Claudio Arredondo, and Claudio Castellón.

Plot 
Santiago Garcia is abandoned by his bride on their wedding day. The image of the bride taking off on a motorcycle quickly becomes viral and has shocked the city. Santiago becomes a celebrity and the most coveted bachelor in the city when the hashtag #PobreNovio (#PoorHusband) becomes a trending topic, a status that makes a businessman offer him the deal of his life: to raffle him as a husband to women who want to marry him.

Cast 
 Etienne Bobenrieth as Santiago García Rossi
 Montserrat Ballarín as Francisca Thompson
 Francisca Walker as Pamela Donoso Cruz
 Diego Muñoz as Eduardo Santander
 Héctor Noguera as Arturo Thompson
 Sigrid Alegría as Betty Cruz
 Carolina Arregui as Vilma Rossi
 Clemente Rodríguez as Iván Donoso Cruz
 Claudio Arredondo as César García
 Claudio Castellón as Johnny Videla
 María José Necochea as Mónica Olavarría
 Teresita Reyes as Bella Martínez
 Alfred Borner as Marco García Rossi
 Nathalie Vera as Génesis Márquez
 Maira Bodenhöfer as Sara
 Catalina del Río as Manuela Santander
 Alexander Solórzano as José Gregorio Márquez
 Fernanda Finsterbusch as Camila
 Mireya Sotoconil as Mirta
 Melissa Brandt as Ximena
 Luz Valdivieso as Alicia Aguilera
 Mabel Farías as Norma
 Katty Kowaleczko as Stella Valderrama
 Claudia Pérez as Graciela López

Ratings

References

External links 
 

2021 telenovelas
2021 Chilean television series debuts
2022 Chilean television series endings
Chilean telenovelas
Mega (Chilean TV channel) telenovelas
Spanish-language telenovelas